No Color is the fourth album by indie folk band The Dodos.

Track listing

Personnel 
 Meric Long – vocals, guitar, piano
 Logan Kroeber – drums, percussion

Additional personnel
 Neko Case – backing vocals
 Keaton Snyder – vibraphone, percussion
 Minna Choi -  strings arrangements
 Erin Wang, Ivo Bokulic, Philip Brezina, Steph Bibbo - strings performing
Jay Pellicci - strings recording

References 

2011 albums
The Dodos albums
Frenchkiss Records albums